"Drinkin' Wine, Spo-Dee-O-Dee" is a jump blues song written by Stick McGhee and J. Mayo Williams in 1949 and originally recorded by "Sticks” McGhee & His Buddies.  It became an early hit for Atlantic Records, reaching #2 on the US R&B charts.

Background
Picardie and Wade in their book Atlantic and the Godfathers of Rock and Roll explain how the Atlantic version came to be.  Stick McGhee had earlier recorded the song in New Orleans for a label that no longer existed and a distributor from New Orleans called Ahmet Ertegun at Atlantic Records to find out if the firm could supply 5,000 copies of the song.  Ertegun could not but offered to make an exact copy of the record. He first had to find someone to sing it and remembered Brownie McGhee whom Ertegun had met in his “endless trips to Harlem. I called him up, and he said he could do it, but as it happened, his brother Stick was staying with him, so he might as well remake his own record.” The song was recorded that same night and went on to sell 400,000 copies.

1949 recordings
The song charted on the US R&B charts by three different artists in 1949, Stick McGhee’s version (“Stick” McGhee & His Buddies reached #2, Wynonie Harris’s hit #4 and Lionel Hampton went up to #13.

Other recordings
The song was covered by Jerry Lee Lewis, it reached number 41 on the Billboard Hot 100.
Other Cover versions were recorded by Big John Greer, Johnny Burnette, Mike Bloomfield's Electric Flag (as "Wine"), and Richard Thompson (as part of 1000 Years of Popular Music).

Charts 
Jerry Lee Lewis version

References

External links 
 "Drinkin' Wine Spo-Dee-O-Dee" by Stick McGhee on Songfacts

1949 songs

Atlantic Records singles
Jerry Lee Lewis songs
1973 singles
Mercury Records singles
Song recordings produced by Steve Rowland
Drinking songs